Farideh Lashai (also Romanized as Farideh Lāshāyī; 1944 – February 24, 2013) was an Iranian painter. She was born in Rasht, Iran. She was also a writer and translator. Her foremost book is Shal Bamu. She is renowned for her abstract contemporary paintings, which are a combination of traditional and contemporary views of nature.

Life
After finishing high school, she went to Germany. After studying in the school of translation in Munich, she studied decorative arts at the Academy of Fine Arts Vienna. She then worked for two years in Reidel company.

Her paintings combined the traditional art with contemporary art, including techniques deriving from late 17th century northern Europe. The traditions of Paul Cézanne, and those of the Far East are present in her works, and yet her works are considered to have a contemporary view of nature. Her works are considered a reflection inner insight and a perception of the soul of nature. She never intended to paint the details, but instead to create a symbol and vague understanding of nature, so that they would have the feeling of nature in them.

In the late 1990s, Lashai co-founded Neda Group, an artist collective composed of 12 Iranian female painters.

At the age of 68, after a long period of dealing with cancer, she died in Jam hospital in Tehran.

Solo exhibitions
1968, Milan, Italy, Gallerie Duomo
1968, Selb, Germany, Studio Rosenthal
1973, Tehran, Iran, Seyhoon Gallery
1974, Tehran, Iran, Tehran Gallery
1976, Tehran, Iran, Tehran Gallery
1977, Khoozestan, Iran, Cultural Center of the National Iranian Oil Company
1984, Bakersfield, USA, Clark Gallery
1987, Basel, Switzerland, Gallery Demenga
1987, La Vallette, Malta, National Museum of Fine Arts
1987, Tehran, Iran, Classic Gallery
1987, Tehran, Iran, Golestan Gallery
1988, Düsseldorf, Germany, Libertas Gallery
1988, Basel, Switzerland, Gallery Demenga
1988, Mammoth Lake, USA, Art Gallery
1990, USA, Berkeley University
1990, London, England, Hill Gallery
1992, Tehran, Iran, Golestan Gallery
1993, Düsseldorf, Germany, Gallery Aum Hufeisen
1994, Tehran, Iran, Golestan Gallery
1995, Pau, France, Gallery Nouste Henric
1996, Tehran, Iran, Golestan Gallery
1997, Laudun, France, Gallery Chateau Lascours
1998, Tehran, Iran, Golestan Gallery
2005, Tehran, Iran, Mah Art Gallery
2016, Sharjah, United Arab Emirates, Sharjah Art Foundation

Group exhibitions
1968, Ostend, Belgium, International Young Artists
1971, Tehran, Iran, International Exhibition of Tehran (as a member of the Austrian Pavilion)
1973, Tehran, Iran, Iranian Women Artists International Exhibition of Tehran
1975, Tehran, Iran, Four Women Artists Exhibition, Iran-America Society
1978, Basel, Switzerland, International Exhibition

See also 
 List of Iranian women artists

References

External links
Mah Art Gallery Biography, Selected Works and Exhibitions on Mah Art Gallery
Elahe Gallery Biography and artworks on Elahe Art Gallery
An Iranian Artist Who Found a Form of Resistance in Nature by Bansie Vasvani, May 9, 2016
The Museo del Prado displays the last work by the Iranian artist Farideh Lashai

Iranian women painters
1944 births
2013 deaths
20th-century women artists
People from Rasht